Crisanto "Jumbo" Bolado (October 25, 1969 – September 17, 2017) was a Filipino professional basketball player.

Basketball career
Bolado played for the National University Bulldogs during his college years. He was selected by Alaska in the second round of the 1994 PBA draft.

He became part of the Alaska Milkmen's 1996 Grand Slam team and in terms of finals stints, Bolado was one of the most successful in the PBA, making it to the championship series for ten straight times - from Alaska, Purefoods, and Gordon's Gin.

In 1999, he was in his fourth PBA team with Pop Cola and then was traded to San Miguel Beermen where he became a member of two more championships. Bolado won a total of 11 titles in the league and retired in 2003.

Later life and death
Bolado moved to Cambodia with his wife in 2013. There he worked as a basketball coach in an international school in Phnom Penh. He also managed Inasal Nation, a Filipino restaurant. He died in a motorcycle accident on September 17, 2017 at age 47 in Phnom Penh.

Personal life
Bolado was married to Anne Christine Waje with whom he had two children. From 2013 until his death, Bolado and his wife resided in Cambodia.

References

1969 births
2017 deaths
Alaska Aces (PBA) players
Barako Bull Energy Boosters players
Barangay Ginebra San Miguel players
Basketball players from Quezon
Centers (basketball)
Filipino expatriates in Cambodia
Filipino men's basketball coaches
Filipino men's basketball players
Magnolia Hotshots players
Motorcycle road incident deaths
Pop Cola Panthers players
Powerade Tigers players
San Miguel Beermen players
Tagalog people
NU Bulldogs basketball players
Philippine Basketball Association All-Stars
Road incident deaths in Cambodia
Alaska Aces (PBA) draft picks